Year 538 (DXXXVIII) was a common year starting on Friday (link will display the full calendar) of the Julian calendar. At the time, it was known as the Year of the Consulship of Iohannes without colleague (or, less frequently, year 1291 Ab urbe condita). The denomination 538 for this year has been used since the early medieval period, when the Anno Domini calendar era became the prevalent method in Europe for naming years.

Events 
 By place 
 Byzantine Empire 
 March 12 – Siege of Rome: King Vitiges of the Ostrogoths ends his siege (after 374 days) and abandons Rome. He retreats with his Gothic army northeast along the Via Flaminia. 
 Belisarius attacks the Goths when they have crossed the Milvian Bridge. After fierce resistance, Vitiges routs in panic, and many are slain or drowned in the river.
 Gothic War: Vitiges strengthens the garrisons of various towns and besieges Ariminum. Byzantine forces under the Armenian general Narses arrive at Picenum.
 April – Belisarius secures Liguria, Mediolanum (modern Milan) and Ariminum, but disagreements, especially with Narses, leads to disunity in the Byzantine army. 
 Summer – King Theudebert I sends a small Frankish force across the Alps, and defeats the Goths and Byzantines at the River Po. Belisarius retreats to Tuscany. 
 Sittas, Byzantine general, suppresses a revolt in Armenia in protest against heavy taxation. During the campaign he is killed by Artabanes, leader of the revolt.

 Britain 
 King Cuneglas of Rhos abandons his wife in favour of his sister-in-law, a nun who he drags from her convent (approximate date).
 Gabrán mac Domangairt becomes king of Dál Riata (Scotland).

 Asia 
 King Seong of Paekche (Korea) moves the capital from Ungjin (present-day Gongju) further south to Sabi (present-day Buyeo County), on the Geum River. He sends a diplomatic mission that formally introduces Buddhism to the Japanese imperial court (see also 552).
 The Kofun period ends and the Asuka period, the second part of the Yamato period in Japan, begins.

 By topic 
 Religion 
 As a result of persecutions by the Byzantine Empire, Monophysite Christians establish the Coptic Church in Alexandria (approximate date).
 The Third Council of Orléans takes place, and prohibits rural labor on Sunday.
 The first time since Emperor Justinian's decree of 533, making John (the Bishop of Rome) Chief Bishop of all the churches, that the supremacy of the Bishop of Rome over the Church can actually be implemented by Vigilius.

 Society 
 Third year of worldwide famine, a consequence of the Extreme weather events of 535–536.

Births 
 Emperor Bidatsu of Japan (d. 585)
 Gregory of Tours, French bishop, historian (d. 594)
 Zhiyi, de facto founder of Tiantai Buddhism (d. 597)

Deaths 
 February 8 – Severus of Antioch, patriarch of Antioch
 Cailtram, king of the Picts (approximate date)
 Comgall mac Domangairt, king of Dál Riata (approximate date)
 Damascius, Byzantine philosopher
 Saint Manchan, Irish Saint.
 Sittas, Byzantine general (magister militum)

Notes and references

Notes

References

Secondary sources